Machaerium villosum, the jacarandá-do-cerrado, jacarandá-pardo, jacarandá-paulista, or jacarandá-pedra, is a species of flowering plant in the family Fabaceae. It is found only in Brazil. It is threatened by habitat loss.

References

villosum
Flora of Brazil
Vulnerable plants
Flora of the Cerrado
Taxonomy articles created by Polbot